HMAS Warrawee was an examination vessel and auxiliary minesweeper which served in the Royal Australian Navy (RAN) during World War II.

Warrawee was built in 1909 by John Reid & Company, Glasgow, Scotland as a cargo passenger steam ship for the Gulf Steamship Company. She plied the Port Adelaide to Edithburgh and Ardrossan run. At the start of World War II, Warrawee was requisitioned and was commissioned into the RAN as an examination vessel and auxiliary minesweeper on 18 September 1941. She was returned to her owners in 1946.

Fate
She was sold to Howard G Smith in 1953 and was broken up.

References

1909 ships
Ships built on the River Clyde
Auxiliary ships of the Royal Australian Navy
Minesweepers of the Royal Australian Navy
Iron and steel steamships of Australia
Coastal trading vessels of Australia